Kamano (Kamano-Kafe) is a Papuan language spoken in Eastern Highlands Province, Papua New Guinea.

Nomenclature
The terms 'Kamano' and 'Kamano-Kafe' are both used to refer to the language primarily spoken in Henganofi District, although within the linguistics literature Kamano refers to some varieties within the Kamano-Yagaria group, a dialect chain of Eastern Highlands Province

Phonology

Consonants 

 Consonant sounds /p t k m n z/ can have preglottalized sounds [ˀp ˀt ˀk ˀm ˀn ˀz] occurring word-medially.
 The phoneme /f/ can be in free fluctuation with a voiceless bilabial fricative [ɸ].

Vowels 

 /e/ can occur as [ɛ] word-initially or word-medially.
 /a/ can occur word initially as [ʌ].

Clause chaining
Kamano Kafe exhibits a unique form of the clause chaining system often described in Papuan languages. Clause chaining in Papuan languages typically involves one or more medial verbs with limited morphological possibilities being under the scope of a more fully inflected final verb. The medial verbs in these clause chains typically use a switch reference system and various degrees of agreement with final verbs. The Kamano system, unlike other clause chaining systems in New Guinea, has requisite person and number agreement with the subjects of higher clauses. A typical example is given below.

References

Kainantu–Goroka languages
Languages of Eastern Highlands Province